Horst Jankhöfer (born 26 January 1942 in Sandersdorf, Saxony-Anhalt) is a former East German handball player who competed in the 1972 Summer Olympics.

In 1972 he was part of the East German team which finished fourth in the Olympic tournament. He played four matches and scored five goals.

References
sports-reference

1942 births
Living people
German male handball players
Olympic handball players of East Germany
Handball players at the 1972 Summer Olympics